Wolf River, Wisconsin can refer to:

Places
Wolf River, Langlade County, Wisconsin
Wolf River, Winnebago County, Wisconsin

Rivers
Wolf River (Fox River), a tributary of the Fox River emptying into Lake Butte des Morts
Wolf River (Eau Claire River), a tributary of the North Fork Eau Claire River.